Walter Savage was MP for Petersfield from  1614 to 1621.

References

People from Petersfield
17th-century English people
English MPs 1614